

Ecglaf (or Eglasius) was a medieval Bishop of Dunwich.

Ecglaf was bishop in the 8th century, but it is not known exactly when he was consecrated or when he died.

References

External links
 

Bishops of Dunwich (ancient)